Events in the year 1767 in Portugal.

Incumbents
Monarch: Joseph I

Births

13 May – John VI of Portugal, king (died 1826).

References

 
1760s in Portugal
Portugal
Years of the 18th century in Portugal
Portugal